Louis Nelson may refer to:
 Louis Nelson (trombonist)
 Louis Nelson (artist)

See also
 Louis Nelson Delisle, clarinetist